Arkedo Studio was a French independent video game developer, founded in 2006 by Camille Guermonprez and Aurélien Régard. The company released their first game, Nervous Brickdown for the Nintendo DS, in 2007. They followed that game with 2009's Big Bang Mini—also for DS, and then later OMG: Our Manic Game for Windows Phone 7. The company's founding goal was to be "as small as possible", while still creating "'real' games - in boxes, with a manual". The company's owners have sought to retain the rights to their intellectual properties; as of January 2010, they continue to hold them all. On February 23, 2013 it was announced that the studio is shutting down.

Games developed

Notes

External links

Hell Yeah! developer Arkedo Studio disbands News about studio shutdown

Video game development companies
Defunct video game companies of France
Companies based in Paris
Video game companies established in 2006
Video game companies disestablished in 2013